The Naturschutzbund Deutschland e.V. ("Nature and Biodiversity Conservation Union") or NABU is a German non-governmental organisation (NGO) dedicated to conservation at home and abroad, including the protection of rivers, forests and individual species of animals.

General facts 
NABU is one of the largest, most well-known, nature conservation groups in Germany and has worked for over 100 years for people and nature. NABU carries out specific conservation projects, maintains a research institute, runs environmental training and informs the media and public about important topics connected with the environment and nature conservation. The society is formally recognised by the German state as an environmental and conservation society, a body responsible for public issues (Träger öffentlicher Belange), and must therefore be consulted over issues affecting the ecology.

NABU has about 530,000 members as active conservationists or supporters. They are organised into more than 1,800 local groups across Germany.

NABU is the national partner organisation of BirdLife International. The organisation is one of the most significant members of the German umbrella organization of the German conservation movement  (DNR).

History 
The NABU was founded  by Lina Hähnle on 1 February 1899 in Stuttgart as the Bund für Vogelschutz (BfV).
In 1990 the BfV merged with former DDR Naturschutz society to Naturschutzbund Deutschland (NABU). Since then, the focus got broader and NABU built up divisions for international conservation projects, marine conservation and energy sufficiency.

Guides
NABU  Ostalb-Guides
NABU  Schwarzwald-Guides
NABU  Neckar-Guides
NABU  Mittlere Alb-Guides

References

External links 

 Official website of the NABU 

Charities based in Germany
Environmental organisations based in Germany
Nature conservation organisations based in Germany
Nature conservation in Germany
Organizations established in 1899
Non-profit organisations based in Berlin
1899 establishments in Germany
Organizations established in 1990
1990 establishments in Germany

Deutscher Naturschutzring